Nielisz  is a village in Zamość County, Lublin Voivodeship, in eastern Poland. It is the seat of the gmina (administrative district) called Gmina Nielisz.

The village has a population of 920.

References

Villages in Zamość County
Lublin Governorate
Lublin Voivodeship (1919–1939)